Gao Yukui  is a retired Chinese athlete. She won a gold medal in the discus throw and a silver in the shot put at the 1974 Asian Games.

References

Chinese female shot putters
Chinese female discus throwers
Athletes (track and field) at the 1974 Asian Games
Living people
Medalists at the 1974 Asian Games
Asian Games silver medalists for China
Asian Games gold medalists for China
Asian Games medalists in athletics (track and field)
Year of birth missing (living people)
20th-century Chinese women